James Richard Sullivan (April 5, 1894 – February 12, 1972) was a Major League Baseball pitcher who played for three seasons. He played for the Philadelphia Athletics from 1921 to 1922 and the Cleveland Indians in 1923. He made his major league debut for the Athletics on September 27, 1921.

References

External links

1894 births
1972 deaths
Major League Baseball pitchers
Philadelphia Athletics players
Cleveland Indians players
Baseball players from Virginia
People from Burtonsville, Maryland
People from Orange County, Virginia